Amberley is a settlement in the civil parish of Marden in Herefordshire, England.

Recorded in the Domesday Book, it was in the hundred of Tornelaus.

Amberley has a Grade II* listed chapel built between the 12th and 14th centuries, and restored in 1865.  Amberley Court is a 14th-century,  Grade I listed country house.

References

External links 
 
 Amberley Herefordshire - A vision of Britain Through Time
 Amberley - Explore Britain
 Geograph images for OS Grid SO5447

Hamlets in Herefordshire